Love and Luck is the eighth studio album by American country music singer Marty Stuart, released in 1994. Nearly all the songs were written or co-written by Stuart himself. The album includes the singles "Love and Luck" and "Kiss Me, I'm Gone". "Wheels" is a cover of The Flying Burrito Brothers, and "If I Give My Soul" of Billy Joe Shaver.

Daniel Gioffre of Allmusic gave the album 3 stars out of 5, praising the covers of Shaver and the Byrds and saying that the album "shows his range nicely".

Track listing

Personnel
Compiled from liner notes.
Musicians (all tracks except "Love and Luck")
 Mike Brignardello - bass guitar
 Stuart Duncan - fiddle, mandolin
 Béla Fleck - banjo
 Paul Franklin - steel guitar
 John Barlow Jarvis - piano, keyboards
 John Jorgenson - electric guitar, acoustic guitar
 Steve Nathan - synthesizer, keyboards
 Randy Scruggs - acoustic guitar, electric guitar, mandolin
 Marty Stuart - lead vocals, electric guitar, acoustic guitar, mandolin
 Lonnie Wilson - drums
Musicians on "Love and Luck"
 Eddie Bayers - drums
 Vince Gill - background vocals
 Liana Manis - background vocals
 Larry Marrs - background vocals
 Brent Mason - mandolin
 Michael Rhodes - bass guitar
 Ricky Skaggs - background vocals
 Harry Stinson - background vocals
Technical
 Tony Brown - production
 John Guess - recording, mixer
 Glenn Meadows - mastering
 Marty Stuart - production
 Marty Williams - overdubbing

Chart performance

References 

1994 albums
Albums produced by Marty Stuart
Marty Stuart albums
MCA Records albums
Albums produced by Tony Brown (record producer)